Buss is a surname. Notable people with the surname include:

Benjamin Buss (born 1977), German guitarist better known as Matthew Greywolf
David Buss (born 1953), American evolutionary psychologist
Frances Buss, British pioneer of women's education
Henrique Adriano Buss, Brazilian footballer 
Jeanie Buss (born 1961), American sports executive; daughter of Jerry Buss
Jerry Buss (1933–2013), American sports executive most famous as longtime owner of the Los Angeles Lakers
Jim Buss (born 1959), American sports executive; son of Jerry Buss
Johnny Buss (born 1956), American sports executive; oldest son of Jerry Buss
Leo Buss, (born 1953), Yale University professor
Robert William Buss (1804–1875), British artist and illustrator
Tito Buss (1925–2013), Brazilian Roman Catholic bishop

See also
Bus (surname)
Busse, surname